Alderano is a given name. Notable people with the name include:

Alderano Cybo-Malaspina (1552-1606), an Italian nobleman, Crown prince of Massa and Carrara
Alderano Cybo (1613–1700), an Italian Catholic Cardinal
Alderano I Cybo-Malaspina (1690-1731),  an Italian nobleman, Duke of Massa and Carrara.

The name Alderan may refer to:

Alderan, a character in the Hungarian epic poem The Siege of Sziget
the fictional Aldaran family in the Darkover series of books

See also
 Alderaan (disambiguation)